The Bach "Super Transport" was a design for a four-engined transport aircraft that was never built.

Design and development
The Bach Aircraft Company was founded by L. Morton Bach in 1927. Following in the footsteps of Fokker with the Fokker F.VII Trimotor, and the metal Ford Trimotor, the Bach Air Yacht was developed as a commercial trimotor transport. In 1928, Bach filed a patent for a four-engined design. The aircraft was similar to the trimotor as a metal-covered, strut-braced biplane, with conventional landing gear. It also featured semi-circular windows like the Stout 2-AT Pullman. The aircraft design featured an unusual modification of the trimotor arrangement with two nose-mounted engines stacked above each other with cockpit windows between them. The fuselage carried a double-decker seating arrangement. The Bach company was reorganized and dissolved during the Great Depression without any examples built.

Specifications (Super Transport estimated)

See also

References

 
1920s United States airliners